Bäk is a village in Khost Province, Afghanistan and the center of the boundary Bak District, close to the  border with Pakistan.

See also
 Khost Province

References

External links

Populated places in Khost Province